Hugh McLean Campbell (21 March 1875 – 22 May 1951), sometimes known as HM Campbell, was a Reform Party Member of Parliament in New Zealand.

Biography

Campbell was born in Te Aute near Pukehou in the Hawke's Bay. His father, Hugh Campbell, was a sheep farmer in Australia, then in Wanaka, and finally in Poukawa south of Hastings. His mother, Margaret Gardiner, died when he was only three years old. He was brought up by his elder sister, Catherine, and Mary Williams, the wife of their neighbour, the missionary Samuel Williams.

On 31 January 1900, he married Mildred Rachel Ralston at Carnarvon in the Manawatu. They had three sons and one daughter.

Campbell founded the Hawke's Bay Tribune in 1910 with his brother-in-law, John Chambers, and George Nelson.

He became a member of the Reform Party. Several newspaper reports in late 1912 say he contracted influenza which developed into typhoid.

He was defeated in 1914, re-elected in 1919 and retired in 1922 due to ill-health. He was re-elected in 1925, and defeated in 1935 in the strong swing towards the Labour Party.

In 1935, he was awarded the King George V Silver Jubilee Medal. He was chairman of the board of directors of The Dominion newspaper from 1934 to 1950.

Campbell died on his farm on 22 May 1951. His wife had died in 1947. They were survived by their children.

Notes

References

1875 births
1951 deaths
Reform Party (New Zealand) MPs
Members of the New Zealand House of Representatives
New Zealand MPs for North Island electorates
Unsuccessful candidates in the 1935 New Zealand general election
Unsuccessful candidates in the 1914 New Zealand general election